The Saint Anthony College of Nursing is a private nursing school affiliated with OSF Saint Anthony Medical Center and located in Rockford, Illinois.

See also
List of nursing schools in the United States

References

External links
Official website

Nursing schools in Illinois
Catholic universities and colleges in Illinois